Swansea SW Wales is a local commercial digital radio multiplex in the United Kingdom, which serves the Swansea area. It is wholly owned by Bauer Media since they gained control of Wireless Groups local stations in the UK. At around the same time they also acquired Celador, Lincs FM Group and UKRD. Bauer own Kiss, Magic,  Hits Radio, Greatest Hits Radio, Wave 105 (South Coast), GEM Radio (East Midlands) and also Absolute Radio.
 The service was launched on 31 January 2004. It was originally labelled TWG-Emap Swansea and then UTV-Bauer Swansea, but in 2010 changed to Swansea SW Wales. It is transmitted on frequency block 12A from the Carmel, Kilvey Hill and St. Hilary transmitters.
Other transmitters:  Mynydd Sylen transmitter near Llanelli; Carmarthen transmitter, Carmarthen.
Bauer is the multiplex owner and it can be heard as far as Newport in the South East Wales and to the south Western super mare and North Devon coast.

Services broadcast
The following stations are transmitted on the Swansea SW Wales multiplex

References

External links
 Switch Digital information website

Mass media in Wales
Digital audio broadcasting multiplexes
Wireless Group
Mass media and culture in Swansea
Bauer Radio